Modra is a Latvian feminine given name. The associated name day is October 4.

References 

Latvian feminine given names
Feminine given names